Venice is a city in Sarasota County, Florida, United States. The city includes what locals call "Venice Island", a portion of the mainland that is accessed via bridges over the artificially created Intracoastal Waterway. The city is located in Southwest Florida. As of the 2020 Census, the city had a population of 25,463. Venice is part of the North Port–Sarasota–Bradenton metropolitan statistical area.

History

The area that is now Venice was originally the home of Paleo-Indians, with evidence of their presence dating back to 8200 BCE. As thousands of years passed, and the climate changed and some of the Pleistocene animals that the Indians hunted became extinct, the descendents of the Paleo-Indians found new ways to create stone and bone weapons to cope with their changing environment. These descendents became known as the Archaic peoples. Evidence of their camps along with their stone tools were discovered in parts of Venice. Over several millennia the culture and people who lived in the area changed. The peoples who the Spanish encountered when they arrived in 1500s were mound-builders. Venice lay in a boundary area between two cultures, the Tocobaga and the Calusa, and so you can find evidence of each in the area.

The 1800s is when the area saw the first wave of "European" settlers. Venice was first known as Horse and Chaise because of a carriage-like tree formation that marked the spot for fishermen. In the 1870s, Robert Rickford Roberts established a homestead near a bay that bears his name today, Roberts Bay. Francis H. "Frank" Higel, originally from France, arrived in Venice in 1883 with his wife and six sons. He purchased land in the Roberts' homestead for $2,500, to set up his own homestead. Higel established a citrus operation involving the production of several lines of canned citrus items, such as jams, pickled orange peel, lemon juice, and orange wine. Higel established a post office in 1885 with the name Eyry as a service for the community's thirty residents. In February he was appointed as postmaster but the office was shut down months later, in November 1885, with services moving back to Osprey. In 1888, another post office was established, this time with the name Venice, a name Higel himself suggested because of its likeness to the canal city in Italy.

During the Florida land boom of the 1920s, Fred H. Albee, an orthopedic surgeon renowned for his bone-grafting operations, bought  from Bertha Palmer to develop Venice. He hired John Nolen to plan the city and create a master plan for the streets. Albee sold the land to the Brotherhood of Locomotive Engineers and retained Nolen as city planner. The first portions of the city and infrastructure were constructed in 1925–1926.

Geography

The climate of Venice is Humid Subtropical, bordering very closely on a Tropical Savanna climate and features pronounced wet and dry seasons.

Climate

Demographics

As of the 2020 census, there was a population of 25,463, with 12,521 households. 

1.2% of the population were under 5 years old, 6.4% were under 18 years old, and 61.9% was 65 years and older. 

Of that population, 92.8% were white, 0.6% black or African American, 0.1% American Indian and Alaska Native, 2.4% Asian, 0.2% Native Hawaiian and Other Pacific Islander, 3.4% two or more races, and 3.1% Hispanic or Latino.

3,204 veterans lived in the city and 9.5% of the population were foreign born persons. 54.6% of the population were female persons. 

90.9% of the households had a computer and 81.3% had a broadband internet subscription. 

The median household income was $61,953 with a per capita income of $60,284. 6.8% of the population lived below the poverty threshold.

Arts and culture

Annual cultural events

Venice has been listed in several publications as being the "Shark's Tooth Capital of the World". It hosts the Shark's Tooth Festival every year to celebrate the abundance of fossilized shark's teeth that can be found on its coastal shores.

Museums and other points of interest
The following structures and areas are listed on the National Register of Historic Places:
 Armada Road Multi-Family District
 Blalock House
 Eagle Point Historic District
 Edgewood Historic District
 Hotel Venice
 House at 710 Armada Road South
 Johnson-Schoolcraft Building
 Levillain-Letton House
 Triangle Inn
 Valencia Hotel and Arcade
 Venezia Park Historic District
 Venice Depot

Theatre and music
Venice Theatre is the largest per-capita community theater in the United States with an operating budget of almost three million dollars.

Media
Venice's newspaper is the Venice Gondolier Sun. It is published twice each week and has a circulation of 13,500 copies.

Tampa Bay's Univision affiliate WVEA-TV is licensed to Venice, though it is based in Tampa and broadcasts from Riverview.

Infrastructure

Transportation
Venice is served by U.S. Highway 41, which runs north–south on the western side of Florida; Interstate 75 is a short distance east of Venice.

Passenger railroad service, served by the Seaboard Coast Line, last ran to the station in 1971, immediately prior to the Amtrak assumption of passenger rail operation. Previously Venice was one of the Florida destinations of the Orange Blossom Special.

Law enforcement
Venice is patrolled by the Venice Police Department, Tom Mattmuller is the current Chief of Police. The small department has special units for bike patrols, traffic patrols, and boat patrols, amongst the normal police services provided. There are a total of 47 police officers that serve Venice.

Notable people
 Brian Aherne, English actor
 Dri Archer, American football player 
 Trey Burton, American football player 
 Hector A. Cafferata Jr., United States Marine who received the Medal of Honor for his heroic service at the Battle of Chosin Reservoir during the Korean War
 Walter Farley, author of The Black Stallion
 Dick Hyman, jazz musician 
 Forrest Lamp, professional football player
 Alvin Mitchell, American football player 
 Tom Tresh, professional baseball player
 Steve Trout, former major league baseball pitcher
 Early Wynn, professional baseball player

See also
 Huffman Aviation, a flight school at Venice Municipal Airport which was attended by several of the hijackers of the September 11 attacks
 Kentucky Military Institute, which wintered in Venice for many years
 Ringling Bros. and Barnum & Bailey Circus, whose Clown College originally was located in Venice, and whose winter headquarters used to be in Venice
 Tervis Tumbler, a United States drinkware manufacturer with headquarters and production in Venice
 Epiphany Cathedral (Venice, Florida), is a Roman Catholic cathedral located in Venice
 Venetian Waterway Park, is a 9.3-mile concrete trail located in Venice consisting of two parallel trails along the Intracoastal Waterway (ICW) connected by two bridges.

References

External links

 
Cities in Sarasota County, Florida
Populated coastal places in Florida on the Gulf of Mexico
Beaches of Sarasota County, Florida
Sarasota metropolitan area
Cities in Florida
Beaches of Florida